The 2008–09 season was Newcastle United's 16th consecutive season in the top division of English football. This season saw the club relegated from the Premier League to the Championship, the first time the club had been relegated since 1989.

Things had looked reasonable for Newcastle at the start of the new season, but a major falling out between Kevin Keegan and the board saw Keegan resign as manager. This led to an awful run of form under caretaker manager Chris Hughton and the surprise appointment of Joe Kinnear was made to try to help the team out. A health scare saw Kinnear have to leave his office as manager in February. Under Hughton and Colin Calderwood, the club went on another horrible run of form as they were sucked deeper into the relegation battle. Ex-player Alan Shearer was appointed as a temporary manager for the last eight matches of the season but he was only able to win one of these games and Newcastle were relegated.

Season summary

Keegan resigns

In the summer transfer window, Newcastle United signed Jonás Gutiérrez, Danny Guthrie, Sébastien Bassong and Fabricio Coloccini. There were also a number of departures from the first team, most notably that of James Milner to Aston Villa, whose departure was rumoured to have sparked disagreements between Keegan and the board, with Keegan claiming he was not consulted about his contract renewal. Shortly after the Arsenal game on 30 August, Spanish under-21 international Xisco was unveiled at St James' Park by Director of Football Dennis Wise.

On 1 September, there were widespread media reports that Keegan had either resigned or been sacked. While these reports were revealed to be premature, Keegan did tender his resignation on 4 September, citing fury over a lack of control over transfers and interference from the board, reflecting upon the sale of James Milner and the arrival of Xisco, a player he claimed to have known nothing about. Many Newcastle fans were furious with the perceived mistreatment of Keegan; public anger was directed at owner Mike Ashley, Executive Director Dennis Wise, Vice-Chairman Tony Jimenez and Chairman Derek Llambias, who were perceived to have forced Keegan out of the club.

Shortly after Keegan's departure, the League Managers Association warned Newcastle United to develop a structure which would satisfy the next manager to avoid a similar situation occurring again. They also reported that Keegan would consider a return to the club should they develop a structure he would be happy with. The club hit back at the allegations, claiming Keegan was aware of the structure when he joined. In December, however, following reports that Ashley was set to end his bid to sell United, it was reported that a legal battle was commencing between Ashley and Keegan, with Ashley rumoured to be claiming damage to his public image and Keegan claiming for breach of contract, following backing from the League Managers Association.

Joe Kinnear

Assistant manager Chris Hughton took over as caretaker manager for several weeks, during which Newcastle remained winless in all three of their matches. On 26 September, Hughton was replaced by Joe Kinnear as "interim manager." Kinnear's appointment proved completely unimpressive with the fans and resulted in Kinnear profusely verbally abusing and swearing at the media upon his first media interview. He then announced he would not speak to any national press again and would only speak with the local media. In his first two matches in charge, Newcastle managed 2–2 draws with Everton and Manchester City, coming from behind both times (the latter with ten men).

In the last week of January, key players Shay Given and Charles N'Zogbia left, causing an already thin squad to lose more talent. Amongst ongoing criticism of the club board following Keegan's departure, Joe Kinnear managed five wins, ten draws, and 11 losses, and talks opened between Joe Kinnear and the board as to whether he would consider a full-time position the following season. On 7 February, however, the club's torrid season took another major blow when Kinnear was admitted to hospital following heart problems, and Chris Hughton once again took charge of the team, this time with the help of Colin Calderwood. By the end of March, the club was struggling to find form and keep pace with the opposition. With scarce wins over the course of the season, the team now faced a relegation battle.

Alan Shearer

Keeping to his decision not to rush Kinnear back into his role too shortly after his surgery, Mike Ashley brought in club icon Alan Shearer to take over from Kinnear as the club's interim manager on 1 April. As Shearer's appointment was announced, Dennis Wise resigned as director of football and the club announced there were no plans to replace him in the role. Shearer hired Iain Dowie as his assistant coach and began his reign as caretaker manager, losing 0–2 to Chelsea at St James' Park and drawing 1–1 away at Stoke City. After losing 1–0 to Tottenham Hotspur at White Hart Lane and drawing 0–0 at home with Portsmouth, the club was plunged even deeper into the tight relegation fight. The ignominious 3–0 loss to title-chasing Liverpool at Anfield on 3 May, with Joey Barton being sent off on 77 minutes for a dangerous tackle, left the club in 18th place. Shearer recorded his first victory as manager on 11 May, defeating fellow strugglers Middlesbrough 3–1, lifting the club out of the relegation zone to 17th place on goal difference.

The feel-good factor did not last, however, as the following week, Newcastle slumped to a 0–1 home defeat to Fulham to fall back in the relegation zone with only the away game to Aston Villa left to play. This left the club needing to better the results of Hull City and Sunderland to avoid relegation. Despite Sunderland, Hull and Middlesbrough all losing their matches, Newcastle United were relegated to the Championship for the first time since 1993 after a 1–0 defeat to Aston Villa.

The club was then placed for sale by Ashley, who noted the club's terrible season following bad decisions on his part, which he believed led the club into major financial loss and constant criticism following relegation. Ashley said, "It has been catastrophic for everybody. I've lost my money and I've made terrible decisions. Now I want to sell it as soon as I can." Newcastle released an official statement on the club's sale, including a press phone number and email address which was quickly made further public by the national press, although the address provided was merely for general enquiries. This resulted in a large number of hoax bids being sent, most of which were made by rival Sunderland supporters. More controversy was once again caused by Dennis Wise, who claimed the club were still paying him £80,000 a month despite his departure in April, and claimed it was a factor in why Ashley was struggling to sell the club.

Compensation to Keegan
On 2 October, a Premier League arbitration panel ruled in favour of Kevin Keegan on his dispute with the club. The club confessed that they had lied to the media, public and staff, and that their correspondence on Keegan's departure was just "PR". 
Keegan confirmed his delight at the outcome, stating he felt the £2 million pay-out + interest fully justified his departure and mistreatment by the club. Dennis Wise announced to the press that he did not feel solely responsible for the situation that developed at the club, but yet did not wish to contradict or debate Keegan's accusations, although he announced deep sorrow over the situation and felt his career has been left "in tatters".

The panel ruled in Keegan's favour, citing that player Nacho González was signed by Dennis Wise against Keegan's wishes, but also against the principles of the generally understood role of a Premier League manager, which usually states the manager has the final decision on player signings. The panel revealed that Wise asked Keegan to review González from YouTube, no more than 24 hours before the closing of the summer transfer window, from which Keegan refuted the player. The club revealed to the panel that Keegan had never been informed his word was not final and that they were not in a position to sack him should he not have agreed to their demands.

Keegan rejected talk of a third return to the club, feeling the fans had "had enough," leaving the role open for Chris Hughton to become full-time manager.

Final league table

Team kit
The team kit for the 2008–09 season was produced by Adidas and Northern Rock remained as the main sponsor. The home kit remained the same for the season while the new away kit was revealed to the public on 20 June 2008.

Managers
 Kevin Keegan (until 4 September 2008; resigned)
 Chris Hughton (6 September 2008 – 26 September 2008; caretaker)
 Joe Kinnear (26 September 2008 – 16 February 2009; due to ill health)
 Colin Calderwood/ Chris Hughton (16 February 2009 – 31 March 2009; caretakers)
 Alan Shearer (31 March 2009 – 24 May 2009)

Players

First-team

Left club during season

Reserve squad
The following players made most of their appearances for the reserve team this season, and did not appear for the first team, but may have been named as a substitute.

Under-18 squad
The following players made most of their appearances for the under-18 team this season, but may have also appeared for the reserves.

Trialists
The following players came to Newcastle as trialists this season.

Chronological list of events
6 June 2008: David Rozehnal was sold to Lazio.

17 June 2008:  Managing director Chris Mort stepped down as chairman and was replaced, as expected, by Derek Llambias.

24 June 2008: Richard Money was appointed new Academy Director.

30 June 2008: Stephen Carr, Peter Ramage and James Troisi left the club after contract expiry.

2 July 2008: Jonás Gutiérrez was signed from Mallorca.

4 July 2008: Steven Taylor signed a three-year extension.

11 July 2008: Danny Guthrie was signed from Liverpool.

14 July 2008: Sébastien Bassong from Metz was taken on trial for a week.

14 July 2008: Emre Belözoğlu was sold to Fenerbahçe.

16 July 2008: Robbie Elliott returned to the club to work as strength and conditioning coach alongside senior fitness coach, Mark Hulse.

16 July 2008: Alan Thompson joined the coaching staff as new academy coach.

30 July 2008: Sébastien Bassong came one step closer to being a Newcastle player when a fee was agreed between Newcastle United and Metz.

7 August 2008: Arthur Cox resigned as assistant manager and returned to his retirement from football.

15 August 2008: Fabricio Coloccini became a Newcastle United player, signing a five-year contract.

15 August 2008: Abdoulaye Faye was sold to Stoke City.

20 August 2008: Shola Ameobi's proposed move to Ipswich Town failed due to injury problem.

27 August 2008: James Milner handed in a written transfer request.

29 August 2008: James Milner was sold to Aston Villa for a fee of £12 million.

29 August 2008: Kamil Zayatte from Young Boys was training with the first-team squad.

1 September 2008: Nacho González from Valencia was taken on a season-long loan deal.

1 September 2008: Xisco was signed from Deportivo de La Coruña.

2 September 2008: Kevin Keegan was rumoured to have resigned or been sacked as manager but official statements from the club later denied those speculations.

4 September 2008: Kevin Keegan resigned as manager after several days of discussions with the board.

5 September 2008: Anil Ambani was again rumored to be interested in a £220 million take over and bring Kevin Keegan back.

6 September 2008: Chris Hughton was named caretaker manager following the departures of Terry McDermott and Adam Sadler.

8 September 2008: Ray Gooding was appointed academy scout joining from Coventry City.

14 September 2008: Mike Ashley announced his intention to sell club following a series of protests by Newcastle supporters angry at Kevin Keegan's departure.

17 September 2008: Mike Ashley was rumored to have snubbed a £200M bid for the club from Dubai-based Zabeel Investments, instead demanding £481M.

22 September 2008: Keith Harris from Seymour Pierce was appointed to act on the potential sale of the club by the board.

23 September 2008: A Nigerian consortium was rumored to line up a £350M. take over bid and bring Kevin Keegan back.

26 September 2008: Joe Kinnear named interim manager.

9 October 2008: Tony Jimenez left the club to pursue other interests.

25 October 2008: Newcastle lost away to Sunderland for the first time in 28 years.

28 November 2008: Joe Kinnear announced as manager until the end of the season.

 14 December 2008: Newcastle United claimed their first away victory of the season with a 3–0 win over Portsmouth with goals from Michael Owen, Obafemi Martins and Danny Guthrie

 28 December 2008: The sale of the club was called off by Mike Ashley.

12 January 2009: Peter Løvenkrands was taken on trial for a week.

23 January 2009: Peter Løvenkrands signed until the end of the season.

26 January 2009: Colin Calderwood joined as a first-team coach until the end of the season.

30 January 2009: Kevin Nolan signed from Bolton Wanderers on a four-and-a-half-year deal.

1 February 2009: Shay Given was sold to Manchester City.

2 February 2009: Ryan Taylor signed from Wigan Athletic with Charles N'Zogbia going in the other direction.

13 February 2009: Joe Kinnear underwent a triple heart bypass operation.

27 March 2009: Peter Beardsley returned to Newcastle once again to coach players at the academy.

1 April 2009: Alan Shearer was announced as temporary manager, to fill in for Kinnear until the end of the 2008–09 season.

1 April 2009: Dennis Wise resigned from his post as Executive Director (Football) following Alan Shearer's appointment as temporary manager.

1 April 2009: Iain Dowie was announced as new assistant manager while Colin Calderwood and Chris Hughton would continue in their coaching roles.

3 April 2009: Paul Ferris returned to the club to be part of Shearer's backroom staff working as physio.

24 May 2009: Newcastle United relegated to The Championship after a 1–0 loss away to Aston Villa.

26 May 2009: Alan Shearer was rumoured to be offered a new four-year deal by Newcastle United, becoming permanent manager of the team.

30 May 2009: Around 150 full and part-time employees of the club were expected to be laid off due to the relegation, including coach Colin Calderwood and Executive Director of Operations David Williamson.

31 May 2009: Mike Ashley reportedly put the club up for sale with a £100M price tag.

1 June 2009: A foreign-based group is believed to have talks regarding a £80M takeover. Another group is also interested. Former chairman Freddy Shepherd is not involved with any of the groups so far.

8 June 2009: The club is officially put up for sale for £100M confirmed through a club statement.

12 June 2009: Several groups and consortiums are reported in talks with the club regarding a take over, including Singapore-based Profitable Group.

Statistics

Appearances, goals and cards
(Substitute appearances in brackets)

Starting formations

Captains

Coaching staff

Transfers

In

 Total spending:  ~ £26,000,000

Out

 Total income:  ~ £32,850,000

Loans in

Loans out

Competitions

Pre-season

League

FA Cup

League Cup

Matches

Pre-season

Premier League

FA Cup

League Cup

References

Newcastle United F.C. seasons
Newcastle United